The 1926 Arkansas gubernatorial election was held on October 5, 1926.

Incumbent Democratic Governor Tom Terral was defeated in the Democratic primary.

Democratic nominee John Ellis Martineau defeated Republican nominee Drew Bowers with 76.45% of the vote.

Democratic primary
The Democratic primary election was held on August 10, 1926.

Candidates
John Ellis Martineau, Chancellor of the Arkansas Chancery Court for the First Chancery District
Tom Terral, incumbent Governor

Results

General election

Candidates
John Ellis Martineau, Democratic
Drew Bowers, Republican, Assistant United States Attorney, Republican nominee for Arkansas's 2nd congressional district in 1924

Results

Notes

References

Bibliography
 
 

1926
Arkansas
Gubernatorial